Melasis buprestoides is a species of false click beetles native to Europe.

The species name buprestoides (from the beetle genus Buprestis, and Ancient Greek ειδής eidēs, "like") refers to the species' body shape.  Linnaeus's original name for the beetle was Elater buprestoides. The genus name Melasis (from Ancient Greek μέλας mélas, "black") refers to the black color of the member species' body.

Description 
The cylindrical beetle is between six and nine millimeters long. The body's greatest width occurs on the leading edge of the scutum.

References

Beetles described in 1761
Beetles of Europe
Elateroidea
Taxa named by Carl Linnaeus